The 2009–10 New York Rangers season was the franchise's 83rd season of play and their 84th season overall. For the first time in five years, the Rangers failed to qualify for the Stanley Cup playoffs.

Off-season
On May 4, 2009, Markus Naslund announced that he would be retiring from professional hockey after playing one season for the Rangers.

At the NHL Entry Draft, the Rangers chose Chris Kreider with their first-round pick, 19th overall. The Rangers followed this with a couple of trades at the draft to acquire Brian Boyle and Chad Johnson. A bigger splash was made a few days later when the Rangers traded Scott Gomez to the Montreal Canadiens. With Gomez's $7 million contract gone, the Rangers then signed free agent Marian Gaborik on July 1, the first day of free agency. On July 16, the Rangers announced that Mike Sullivan had been hired as an assistant coach.

On August 16, 2009, Mark Messier rejoined the Rangers organization as a special assistant to general manager Glen Sather.

Pre-season

Regular season
The NHL took a two-week break from February 15 to March 1 for the Olympics. The Rangers had five players represent their countries; Chris Drury and Ryan Callahan for the United States, Marian Gaborik for Slovakia, Olli Jokinen for Finland and Henrik Lundqvist for Sweden.

Divisional standings

Conference standings

Schedule and results

|- align="center" bgcolor="#FFBBBB"
| 1 || 2 || @ Pittsburgh Penguins || 3–2 || Lundqvist || 0–1–0
|- align="center" bgcolor="#CCFFCC"
| 2 || 3 || Ottawa Senators || 5–2 || Lundqvist || 1–1–0
|- align="center" bgcolor="#CCFFCC"
| 3 || 5 || @ New Jersey Devils || 3–2 || Lundqvist || 2–1–0
|- align="center" bgcolor="#CCFFCC"
| 4 || 8 || @ Washington Capitals || 4–3 || Lundqvist || 3–1–0
|- align="center" bgcolor="#CCFFCC"
| 5 || 11 || Anaheim Ducks || 3–0 || Valiquette || 4–1–0
|- align="center" bgcolor="#CCFFCC"
| 6 || 12 || Toronto Maple Leafs || 7–2 || Lundqvist || 5–1–0
|- align="center" bgcolor="#CCFFCC"
| 7 || 14 || Los Angeles Kings || 4–2 || Lundqvist || 6–1–0
|- align="center" bgcolor="#CCFFCC"
| 8 || 17 || @ Toronto Maple Leafs || 4–1 || Lundqvist || 7–1–0
|- align="center" bgcolor="#FFBBBB"
| 9 || 19 || San Jose Sharks || 7–3 || Valiquette || 7–2–0
|- align="center" bgcolor="#FFBBBB"
| 10 || 22 || New Jersey Devils || 4–2 || Lundqvist || 7–3–0
|- align="center" bgcolor="white"
| 11 || 24 || @ Montreal Canadiens || 5–4 OT || Lundqvist || 7–3–1
|- align="center" bgcolor="#CCFFCC"
| 12 || 26 || Phoenix Coyotes || 5–2 || Lundqvist || 8–3–1
|- align="center" bgcolor="#FFBBBB"
| 13 || 28 || @ New York Islanders || 3–1 || Lundqvist || 8–4–1
|- align="center" bgcolor="#FFBBBB"
| 14 || 30 || @ Minnesota Wild || 3–2 || Lundqvist || 8–5–1
|-

|- align="center" bgcolor="#CCFFCC"
| 15 || 1 || Boston Bruins || 1–0 || Lundqvist || 9–5–1
|- align="center" bgcolor="#FFBBBB"
| 16 || 3 || @ Vancouver Canucks || 4–1 || Lundqvist || 9–6–1
|- align="center" bgcolor="#CCFFCC"
| 17 || 5 || @ Edmonton Oilers || 4–2 || Valiquette || 10–6–1
|- align="center" bgcolor="#FFBBBB"
| 18 || 7 || @ Calgary Flames || 3–1 || Valiquette || 10–7–1
|- align="center" bgcolor="#FFBBBB"
| 19 || 12 || Atlanta Thrashers || 5–3 || Lundqvist || 10–8–1
|- align="center" bgcolor="#CCFFCC"
| 20 || 14 || @ Ottawa Senators || 2–1 SO || Lundqvist || 11–8–1
|- align="center" bgcolor="#FFBBBB"
| 21 || 17 || Washington Capitals || 4–2 || Lundqvist || 11–9–1
|- align="center" bgcolor="#FFBBBB"
| 22 || 21 || Florida Panthers || 3–2 || Lundqvist || 11–10–1
|- align="center" bgcolor="#CCFFCC"
| 23 || 23 || Columbus Blue Jackets || 7–4 || Lundqvist || 12–10–1
|- align="center" bgcolor="#CCFFCC"
| 24 || 25 || @ Florida Panthers || 2–1 SO || Lundqvist || 13–10–1
|- align="center" bgcolor="#FFBBBB"
| 25 || 27 || @ Tampa Bay Lightning || 5–1 || Lundqvist || 13–11–1
|- align="center" bgcolor="#FFBBBB"
| 26 || 28 || @ Pittsburgh Penguins || 8–3 || Valiquette || 13–12–1
|- align="center" bgcolor="#FFBBBB"
| 27 || 30 || Pittsburgh Penguins || 5–2 || Lundqvist|| 13–13–1
|-

|- align="center" bgcolor="#CCFFCC"
| 28 || 5 || @ Buffalo Sabres || 2–1 || Lundqvist || 14–13–1
|- align="center" bgcolor="#FFBBBB"
| 29 || 6 || Detroit Red Wings || 3–1 || Lundqvist || 14–14–1
|- align="center" bgcolor="white"
| 30 || 9 || @ Chicago Blackhawks || 2–1 OT || Lundqvist || 14–14–2
|- align="center" bgcolor="#FFBBBB"
| 31 || 12 || Buffalo Sabres || 3–2 || Lundqvist || 14–15–2
|- align="center" bgcolor="white"
| 32 || 14 || Atlanta Thrashers || 3–2 SO || Lundqvist || 14–15–3
|- align="center" bgcolor="#FFBBBB"
| 33 || 16 || New York Islanders || 2–1 || Lundqvist || 14–16–3
|- align="center" bgcolor="#CCFFCC"
| 34 || 17 || @ New York Islanders || 5–2 || Lundqvist || 15–16–3
|- align="center" bgcolor="#CCFFCC"
| 35 || 19 || @ Philadelphia Flyers || 2–1 || Lundqvist || 16–16–3
|- align="center" bgcolor="#CCFFCC"
| 36 || 21 || @ Carolina Hurricanes || 3–1 || Lundqvist || 17–16–3
|- align="center" bgcolor="#CCFFCC"
| 37 || 23 || Florida Panthers || 4–1 || Lundqvist || 18–16–3
|- align="center" bgcolor="white"
| 38 || 26 || New York Islanders || 3–2 OT || Lundqvist || 18–16–4
|- align="center" bgcolor="#FFBBBB"
| 39 || 30 || Philadelphia Flyers || 6–0 || Lundqvist || 18–17–4
|- align="center" bgcolor="#CCFFCC"
| 40 || 31 || @ Carolina Hurricanes || 2–1 || Lundqvist || 19–17–4
|-

|- align="center" bgcolor="white"
| 41 || 2 || Carolina Hurricanes || 2–1 OT || Lundqvist || 19–17–5
|- align="center" bgcolor="#CCFFCC"
| 42 || 4 || Boston Bruins || 3–2 || Lundqvist || 20–17–5
|- align="center" bgcolor="#CCFFCC"
| 43 || 6 || Dallas Stars || 5–2 || Lundqvist || 21–17–5
|- align="center" bgcolor="white"
| 44 || 7 || @ Atlanta Thrashers || 2–1 SO || Johnson || 21–17–6
|- align="center" bgcolor="#CCFFCC"
| 45 || 9 || @ Boston Bruins || 3–1 || Lundqvist || 22–17–6
|- align="center" bgcolor="white"
| 46 || 12 || New Jersey Devils || 1–0 SO || Lundqvist || 22–17–7
|- align="center" bgcolor="#FFBBBB"
| 47 || 14 || Ottawa Senators || 2–0 || Lundqvist || 22–18–7
|- align="center" bgcolor="#FFBBBB"
| 48 || 16 || @ St. Louis Blues || 4–1 || Johnson || 22–19–7
|- align="center" bgcolor="#CCFFCC"
| 49 || 17 || Montreal Canadiens || 6–2 || Lundqvist || 23–19–7
|- align="center" bgcolor="#CCFFCC"
| 50 || 19 || Tampa Bay Lightning || 8–2 || Lundqvist || 24–19–7
|- align="center" bgcolor="#FFBBBB"
| 51 || 21 || @ Philadelphia Flyers || 2–0 || Lundqvist || 24–20–7
|- align="center" bgcolor="#FFBBBB"
| 52 || 23 || @ Montreal Canadiens || 6–0 || Lundqvist || 24–21–7
|- align="center" bgcolor="#FFBBBB"
| 53 || 25 || Pittsburgh Penguins || 4–2 || Lundqvist || 24–22–7
|- align="center" bgcolor="#FFBBBB"
| 54 || 27 || Carolina Hurricanes || 5–1 || Lundqvist || 24–23–7
|- align="center" bgcolor="#FFBBBB"
| 55 || 30 || @ Phoenix Coyotes || 3–2 || Johnson || 24–24–7
|- align="center" bgcolor="#CCFFCC"
| 56 || 31 || @ Colorado Avalanche || 3–1 || Johnson || 25–24–7
|-

|- align="center" bgcolor="#FFBBBB"
| 57 || 2 || @ Los Angeles Kings || 2–1 || Lundqvist || 25–25–7
|- align="center" bgcolor="#FFBBBB"
| 58 || 4 || Washington Capitals || 6–5 || Lundqvist || 25–26–7
|- align="center" bgcolor="#CCFFCC"
| 59 || 6 || New Jersey Devils || 3–1 || Lundqvist || 26–26–7
|- align="center" bgcolor="#FFBBBB"
| 60 || 10 || Nashville Predators || 2–1 || Lundqvist || 26–27–7
|- align="center" bgcolor="#CCFFCC"
| 61 || 12 || @ Pittsburgh Penguins || 3–2 OT || Lundqvist || 27–27–7
|- align="center" bgcolor="#CCFFCC"
| 62 || 14 || Tampa Bay Lightning || 5–2 || Lundqvist || 28–27–7
|-

|- align="center" bgcolor="#CCFFCC"
| 63 || 2 || @ Ottawa Senators || 4–1 || Lundqvist || 29–27–7
|- align="center" bgcolor="white"
| 64 || 4 || Pittsburgh Penguins || 5–4 OT || Lundqvist || 29–27–8
|- align="center" bgcolor="#FFBBBB"
| 65 || 6 || @ Washington Capitals || 2–0 || Auld || 29–28–8
|- align="center" bgcolor="white"
| 66 || 7 || Buffalo Sabres || 2–1 OT || Lundqvist || 29–28–9
|- align="center" bgcolor="#FFBBBB"
| 67 || 10 || @ New Jersey Devils || 6–3 || Lundqvist || 29–29–9
|- align="center" bgcolor="#CCFFCC"
| 68 || 12 || @ Atlanta Thrashers || 5–2 || Lundqvist || 30–29–9
|- align="center" bgcolor="#CCFFCC"
| 69 || 14 || Philadelphia Flyers || 3–1 || Lundqvist || 31–29–9
|- align="center" bgcolor="#FFBBBB"
| 70 || 16 || Montreal Canadiens || 3–1 || Lundqvist || 31–30–9
|- align="center" bgcolor="#FFBBBB"
| 71 || 18 || St. Louis Blues || 4–3 || Lundqvist || 31–31–9
|- align="center" bgcolor="#FFBBBB"
| 72 || 21 || @ Boston Bruins || 2–1 || Lundqvist || 31–32–9
|- align="center" bgcolor="#CCFFCC"
| 73 || 24 || New York Islanders || 5–0 || Lundqvist || 32–32–9
|- align="center" bgcolor="#CCFFCC"
| 74 || 25 || @ New Jersey Devils || 4–3 SO || Lundqvist || 33–32–9
|- align="center" bgcolor="white"
| 75 || 27 || @ Toronto Maple Leafs || 3–2 OT || Lundqvist || 33–32–10
|- align="center" bgcolor="#CCFFCC"
| 76 || 30 || @ New York Islanders || 4–3 || Lundqvist || 34–32–10
|-

|- align="center" bgcolor="#CCFFCC"
| 77 || 2 || @ Tampa Bay Lightning || 5–0 || Lundqvist || 35–32–10
|- align="center" bgcolor="#CCFFCC"
| 78 || 3 || @ Florida Panthers || 4–1 || Lundqvist || 36–32–10
|- align="center" bgcolor="#FFBBBB"
| 79 || 6 || @ Buffalo Sabres || 5–2 || Lundqvist || 36–33–10
|- align="center" bgcolor="#CCFFCC"
| 80 || 7 || Toronto Maple Leafs || 5–1 || Lundqvist || 37–33–10
|- align="center" bgcolor="#CCFFCC"
| 81 || 9 || Philadelphia Flyers || 4–3 || Lundqvist || 38–33–10
|- align="center" bgcolor="white"
| 82 || 11 || @ Philadelphia Flyers || 2–1 SO || Lundqvist || 38–33–11
|-

Playoffs
The New York Rangers failed to qualify for the 2010 Stanley Cup playoffs, despite going 7–1–2 at the end of the season. Their run set up a home and home series with the eighth place Philadelphia Flyers, but the Rangers fell to the Flyers in a shootout in the final game of the season and finished one point out of the playoffs.

Player statistics
Skaters

Goaltenders

†Denotes player spent time with another team before joining Rangers. Stats reflect time with Rangers only.
‡Traded mid-season. Stats reflect time with Rangers only.

Awards and records

Awards

Milestones

Transactions
The Rangers have been involved in the following transactions during the 2009–10 season.

Trades

|}

Free agents acquired

Free agents lost

Claimed via waivers

Lost via waivers

Lost via retirement

Player signings

Draft picks
New York's picks at the 2009 NHL Entry Draft in Montreal, Quebec, Canada, at the Bell Centre.

* On March 11, 2009, the NHL general managers agreed to award the 17th selection of the second round as a compensatory pick to the New York Rangers for deceased player Alexei Cherepanov.

See also
 2009–10 NHL season

Farm teams

Hartford Wolf Pack (AHL)
The 2009–10 season will be the 13th season of AHL hockey for the franchise.

Charlotte Checkers (ECHL)
The 2009–10 season will be the 17th and final season of ECHL hockey for the franchise, as their place will be taken by an American Hockey League team of the same name (currently known as the Albany River Rats) for the 2010–11 season.

References
 Game log: New York Rangers game log on espn.com
 Player stats: New York Rangers statistics on espn.com

External links
 2009–10 New York Rangers season at ESPN
 2009–10 New York Rangers season at Hockey Reference

New York Rangers seasons
New York Rangers
New York Rangers
New York Rangers
New York Rangers
 in Manhattan
Madison Square Garden